USS Idylease (SP-119) was a motor yacht leased by the U.S. Navy during World War I. She was outfitted as a patrol craft and was assigned to the Hampton Roads and Norfolk, Virginia, waterways. Post-war, she was restored to her civilian configuration and returned to her owner.

Constructed in New York 

Idylease (SP-119), a 65-foot motor yacht, was built in 1916 by Kyle and Purdy, City Island, New York as the civilian pleasure motor boat of the same name; acquired by the Navy from Richard Goldsmith of New York City in June 1917, and commissioned 9 July 1917.

World War I service 
 
Assigned to the 5th Naval District for the rest of World War I and during the initial post-war months, Idylease performed patrol and radio inspection duties in Hampton Roads, Norfolk, Virginia, and on the Elizabeth River during the war.

Post-war disposition 

She was returned to her owner at Norfolk 30 April 1919.

References 
 
 USS Idylease (SP-119), 1917-1919. Previously Civilian Motor Boat Idylease (1916)

World War I patrol vessels of the United States
Patrol vessels of the United States Navy
Individual yachts
Motor yachts
Ships built in City Island, Bronx
1916 ships